A jackaroo is a young man (feminine equivalent jillaroo) working on a sheep or cattle station, to gain practical experience in the skills needed to become an owner, overseer, manager, etc. The word originated in Queensland, Australia in the 19th century and is still in use in Australia and New Zealand in the 21st century. Its origins are unclear, although it is firmly rooted in Australian English, Australian culture and in the traditions of the Australian stockmen.

Etymology

Jackaroo 
The word jackaroo, also formerly spelled jackeroo, has been used in Australia since at least the middle of the 19th century and passed from there into common usage in New Zealand. Its use in both countries continues into the 21st century. The origin of the word is obscure and probably unknowable, but its first documented use was in Queensland. Several possibilities have been put forward:

A deverbal noun which became a common noun through frequent occupational usage; derived from the practice of roasting a kangaroo on a spit. A "jack" being a person who turned meat on a spit or rotisserie. To "jack a 'roo" was to turn a kangaroo on a spit, a very common practice among rural workers in remote parts of Australia since colonial times.
An Australian variation on the term for American cowboys, who were sometimes called 'buckaroos'.  The term 'buckaroo' was derived from the Spanish word 'vaquero'.
An origin from an indigenous language term for 'a wandering white man'.
Another suggestion (1895) was for an origin from an Aboriginal word for a pied currawong, a garrulous bird, which the strange-sounding language of the white settlers reminded them of. Meston explained his position in a newspaper in 1919.
By 1906, immigrants into Australia were often called Johnny Raws. From that it became Jacky Raw.
By 1925, it was said that the term jackeroo originated from the fact that "one of the earliest [...] was named 'Jack Carew'."
A 'Jack of all Trades in Australia' (Jack + kangaroo), has much popular support. The Brisbane Courier newspaper, of Queensland, on 5 July 1929, page 16, stated in answer to a question from a reader 'POMMY' of Toowong: 
The Encyclopaedia of Australia stated in 1968 that it is "most probably a coined Australian-sounding word based on a [person] 'Jacky Raw'" Jackaroos (Jacky + Raw) were often young men from Britain or from city backgrounds in Australia, which would explain the pejorative use of  'raw' in the sense of 'inexperienced'.
Arguably the most authoritative voice in 2010 was that of the Australian National Dictionary Centre of the Research School of the Humanities at the Australian National University, which provides Oxford University Press with editorial expertise for their Australian dictionaries. They have explained their reasons for making no final judgment, and raise another possibility, that 'jackeroo' is derived from an aboriginal word for 'stranger' rather than for a 'pied crow shrike'.
 The spellings jackaroo and jackeroo were both used from about 1880 to at least 1981. In 2010, the more commonly used spelling was 'jackaroo'. However, between the years 1970 and 1981, a sample of Australian newspapers referred to 'jackeroo' 18 times and 'jackaroo' 29 times.

Jillaroo 
The word jillaroo for a female landworker was coined in the Second World War and persisted into the 21st century. During the war it was necessary for women to take on all the occupations followed traditionally only by men. Jillaroos were the female equivalent of jackeroos. Jack and Jill was a widely known nursery rhyme at that time, and suggests the derivation of Jillaroo from Jackaroo.

History 
Usage, practice, and social conditions have changed over time.

19th century 
An early reference to jackaroos can be found in Tibb's popular song book, published between 1800 and 1899. This book begins by describing itself as: "Containing the latest hits on Busy in town, Australia's carsman, The Chinese and federation, Squatters' defeat, Australia's happy land, The Jackaroo, &c., &c.,"

In 1867, Temple Bar magazine featured an essay, "Reminiscences of Bush Life in Queensland," in which the anonymous author calls himself a "Jackaroo" due to his inexperience (the story takes place in 1863).

In 1878, 'Ironbark' stated "Young gentlemen getting their 'colonial experience' in the bush are called 'jackeroos' by the station-hands. The term is seldom heard except in the remote 'back-blocks'  of the interior."

Colonial experience is a term, commonly used in the 19th- and early 20th-centuries for the acquisition of skills and experience in Australia by young English gentlemen, in the expectation of preferential treatment back in England when applying for a position with possibility of advancement, such as a clerk in a large mercantile establishment. The jackaroo's employment may have been made by agreement between his father and the wealthy squatter through some connection, with the son working for a year in a variety of roles for his board and lodging. This was often seen as a great advantage to the squatter, who gained an intelligent and subservient worker at minimal expense.

Early 20th century 
In 1933, A. J. Cotton stated "Today the Arbitration Court (Commonwealth Court of Conciliation and Arbitration) says that a jackeroo must be paid 25/- [shillings] per week. If an ordinary jackeroo paid the station 25 shillings per week for the first twelve months, he would not compensate them for the damage he does (just through want of experience), no matter how willing he may be. It just happens that way, and all the Arbitration Courts, the curse of Australia, won't alter it."

Cotton was a self-made man and landowner (at Hidden Vale), who had left home at 14 to become a seaman. Later he became a member of the Queensland Club and included a thank you letter from the Governor of Queensland, John Goodwin, in the introduction to his own autobiography

Bill Harney states that there was no division of rank in the outlying camps, "all ate around the same fire and slept in the open. But at the head-station a change came over all this. The social strata of station life, reading from top to bottom, was bosses, jackaroos, men and blacks. This was a carry-over from the early days, when a rigid caste system ruled the land."

This was most clearly evident in the segregated eating arrangements, "The boss and the jackaroos ate meals in the 'big' or 'government' house. [...] The men – that is, the stockmen, teamsters, blacksmiths, etc. – ate their tucker in the kitchen and slept in the huts, while the Aborigines were given a hand-out from the door of the kitchen and ate it on the woodheap [firewood]."

"And strangely enough, this division of caste had caste bells which called us to our meals – a tinkling bell for government house, a horse bell for the kitchen men, and a triangle for the blacks on the wood-heaps." ... "In keeping with this system, the bush towns maintained a social tradition of coffee rooms for the gentry and dining rooms for the workers."

By 1936 Vigars said "A jackeroo may be called upon to do all manner of work on a station, such as clerical work, boundary riding, mustering sheep and cattle, fencing [repairing fences], and generally any work there may be about the place, so that he not only needs a fair education, but intelligence and adaptability". Vigars continues, "A jackeroo is a title signifying a youth under training for the pastoral profession, and corresponding to the midshipman on a warship – an apprentice in the Mercantile Marine Service – or in a commercial house – an articled clerk in a solicitor's office, and so on."

Late 20th century 
The traditional method for training young men for practical occupations had been the apprenticeship, and this began to be replaced by programs of formal schooling. The jackaroo, as a form of apprenticeship, followed the trend.

Changes in Australian agricultural society 
[1975] – Michael Thornton wrote a small book hoping to contribute "to the memories of what might well become a dying avenue of Australian tradition".

Dissatisfaction with the existing practices began to be expressed:

[1978] – "Jackaroos are, or were, sweated labour. The legend is that they are social equals with the station owners, and are virtually treated as belonging to the family. Because of this, they receive only about half the pay of a station hand, and are liable for duty at any time."

Most jillaroos returned to the cities after the 1939–45 War ended. But during the '70s, as a consequence of feminist thinking, a new source of jillaroos began to appear. Susan Cottam, an English woman, described her experiences in Western Queensland from 3 March 1966 to 3 March 1968, in the form of a journal.

21st century 
Dubbo and Kimberley Technical and further education (TAFE) centres provide a certificate course of practical experiences for people who want to work as jackaroos or jillaroos on rural properties. The course covers practical aspects of farm work at an introductory level.

See also 
 Cowboy

References

Australian English
Livestock in Australia
Animal husbandry occupations